Protea Glen is a township of Johannesburg, Gauteng Province, South Africa, located north of Lenasia and west of Soweto.

The suburb was developed in the 1990s for middle-class residents.

The first shopping mall in the town, Protea Glen Mall, opened in October 2012. and also there are many schools like Basa Tutorial Institute, Faranani Primary School, Protea Glen Secondary School and ACUDEO COLLEGE. 1,2

References

Johannesburg Region D
Soweto Townships